Olexandr Stretskyy, also known as Oleksandr Stretskiy, (born 6 May 1986) is a Ukrainian professional boxer who competes as a middleweight. As an amateur, he won a bronze medal in the welterweight division of the 2006 European Amateur Boxing Championships and thereby qualified to represent Ukraine at the 2008 Olympics.

Amateur career

European Championships results
2006
Defeated Borna Katalinić (Croatia) 
Defeated Samuel Matevosyan (Armenia)
Lost to Andrey Balanov (Russia) 31-11

Olympic Games results

2008
Defeated Gilbert Lenin Castillo (Dominican Republic) 9-6
Lost to Tureano Johnson (Bahamas) 4-9

Professional boxing record

External links
2006 European Championships Results
Olympic qualifier

1986 births
Welterweight boxers
Living people
Boxers at the 2008 Summer Olympics
Olympic boxers of Ukraine
Ukrainian male boxers
Sportspeople from Dnipro